Barbara Townsend (1913-2002) was an American film and television actress. She is perhaps best known for her role as Mildred Potter in the series AfterMASH. Her film roles include One Good Cop, Hard to Kill and Annihilator.

TV credits
Murder, She Wrote (1993)
Northern Exposure (1993)
Civil Wars (1992)
Quantum Leap (1991)
Mama's Family (1990)
Hunter (1987)
St. Elsewhere (1987)
Mr. Belvedere (1986)
Highway to Heaven (1985)
Knight Rider (1985)
Remington Steele (1984)
Little House on the Prairie (1983)
The Streets of San Francisco (1977)
Highway Patrol (1957)
Alfred Hitchcock Presents (1957)

References

1913 births
2002 deaths
20th-century American actresses